Korreh Siah-e Talkh (also Romanized as Korreh Sīāh-e Talkh, Korreh Sīāh Talkh, and Koreh Sīāh-e Talkh; also known as Koreh Sīāh, Korreh Seyāh, Korreh Sīāh, and Korreh Sīyāh) is a village in Dodangeh Rural District, in the Central District of Behbahan County, Khuzestan Province, Iran. At the 2006 census, its population was 313, in 57 families.

References 

Populated places in Behbahan County